The Women's Freestyle 57 kg was a competition featured at the 2022 European Wrestling Championships, and was held in Budapest, Hungary  on March 31 and 1 April.

Medalists

Results 
 Legend
 F — Won by fall

Main Bracket

Repechage

Final standing

References

External links
Draw

Women's Freestyle 57 kg
2022 in women's sport wrestling